Mangelia mica is a species of sea snail, a marine gastropod mollusk in the family Mangeliidae.

Description

Distribution
This species occurs in the Red Sea.

References

 Vine, P. (1986). Red Sea Invertebrates. Immel Publishing, London. 224 pp

External links
  Tucker, J.K. 2004 Catalog of recent and fossil turrids (Mollusca: Gastropoda). Zootaxa 682:1–1295.

mica
Gastropods described in 1849